Cerro Araral is a mountain located in the Andes on the border between Chile and Bolivia in the Potosí Department and in the Antofagasta Region. Based on the erosion rate, the volcano is 1.9-2.75 and forms an alignment with Cerro Ascotan. Its formation may be linked to the Altiplano-Puna Magma Body. The modern snowline on the mountain lies at more than  altitude. The volcanism is at first andesitic and later becomes intermediary between andesite and basalt, with olivine, plagioclase and pyroxene.

See also
List of mountains in the Andes

References 

Volcanoes of Potosí Department
Stratovolcanoes of Chile
Landforms of Antofagasta Region